Fanny may refer to:

Given name
 Fanny (name), a feminine given name or a nickname, often for Frances

In slang
 A term for the vulva, in Britain and many other parts of the English-speaking world
 A term for the buttocks, in the United States

Plays and films
 Fanny (play), a 1931 play by Marcel Pagnol
 Fanny (1932 film), a French adaptation
 Fanny (1933 film), an Italian production
 Fanny (musical), a 1954 Broadway musical based on the Pagnol plays Marius, Fanny and César
 Fanny (1961 film), an American non-musical film based on the 1954 musical
 Fanny (2013 film), a French adaptation by Daniel Auteuil
 Fanny: The Right to Rock, a 2021 Canadian documentary film directed by Bobbi Jo Hart profiling Fanny (band)

Music
 Fanny (band), an American all-female band active in the early 1970s
 Fanny (album), 1970 self-titled debut album by the band
 Fanny (singer) (born 1979), French singer
 Fanny J (born 1987), French singer from Guiana
 "Fanny (Be Tender with My Love)", a 1975 song by the Bee Gees from Main Course
 "Fanny", a song by Argentine singer Leo Dan
 "Fanny", a song by Spratleys Japs from Pony

Places
 Fanny Township, Polk County, Minnesota
 Fanny, West Virginia, an unincorporated community
 821 Fanny, an asteroid

Other uses
 List of ships named Fanny
 Fanny Award, a fan voted award for the adult entertainment industry
 Fanny's, a restaurant in Evanston, Illinois
 "Fanny", a poem by Edgar Allan Poe

See also
 Fanny pack, a pouch bag worn with straps that secure around the waist
 Fanny von Stratzing, the German name for the Venus of Galgenberg, a prehistoric statuette
 Fannie, a given name (including a list of people with the name)
 Fanni (disambiguation)
 FANY (disambiguation)